The  is Japanese aerial lift line in Tateyama, Toyama, operated by Tateyama Kurobe Kankō. The line, opened in 1970, makes a part of Tateyama Kurobe Alpine Route. It is famous for being the single span line without any aerial lift pylon.

Basic data
System: Aerial tramway
Cable length: 
Distance: 
Vertical interval: 
Passenger capacity per a cabin: 80
Stations: 2
Time required for single ride: 7 minutes

See also
Tateyama Kurobe Alpine Route
List of aerial lifts in Japan

External links
 Tateyama Kurobe Alpine Route official website
 Tateyama Kurobe Alpine Route official website

 

Aerial tramways in Japan
Tateyama Kurobe Alpine Route
1970 establishments in Japan